Caleb Quaye (born 9 October 1948), is an English rock guitarist and studio musician best known for his work in the 1960s and 1970s with Elton John, Mick Jagger, Pete Townshend, Paul McCartney, Hall & Oates and Ralph McTell, and also toured with Shawn Phillips in the 1970s. He is the son of Cab Kaye, younger brother of Terri Quaye, and older half-brother of singer Finley Quaye.

Early career
Quaye was a member of local band The SoundCasters (Sound Castles) while at school.
Quaye spent several years as a member of Long John Baldry's backing band, Bluesology, which also featured a keyboard player named Reg Dwight, who would soon become known as Elton John. When Bluesology disbanded in 1967, Quaye released a single under the name Caleb called "Baby Your Phrasing is Bad" b/w "Woman of Distinction" (1967, Philips Records). In 1969 he served as guitarist for the one-off "flower power" pop band Argosy (which also included Dwight, Roger Hodgson, and Nigel Olsson) on their single, "Mr. Boyd" b/w "Imagine".

Starting in 1969, Quaye played guitar supporting Elton John at live concerts around the local London area, with what eventually became the nucleus of Hookfoot for sporadic shows.  The live support work continued until Elton formed his original touring band in the spring of 1970, the trio featuring Dee Murray and Nigel Olsson.

In April 1970, Quaye formed the band Hookfoot with Ian Duck, Roger Pope and David Glover, all of whom were DJM Records house musicians and had backed Elton's earliest live performances. The group's self-titled debut album was a mix of rock and jazz and included songs by Quaye and Duck, in addition to Stephen Stills and Neil Young covers. Quaye played guitar and keyboards on this album. The group's follow-up record Good Times a-Comin'  was a more straight-ahead rock album. A third album was Communication and the last album titled Roarin' . A live album called Hookfoot Live in Memphis, recorded in 1973 was released later.  The group disbanded in 1974 and Quaye stayed in the United States to work as a session musician. He is credited as a guitarist on Bill Quateman's 1973 debut album, Bill Quateman, and toured with Quateman in support of the album.

Quaye played guitar, bass and drums on "Forever's No Time at All", written and sung by Nicholls. It opened I Am, a 1972 album dedicated to Meher Baba also featuring Pete Townshend.  Later that year, the song appeared on Townshend's solo debut Who Came First.

Quaye played guitar on the original demos for Joan Armatrading's debut album Whatever's for Us, which was released in November 1972. The demos were recorded by Gus Dudgeon at Marquee Studios, London.

Subsequently, Caleb Quaye was enlisted by Billy Nicholls to play lead guitar, bass, drums and keyboards on Love Songs, recorded in 1974 and released on GM Records.

Elton John Band
Quaye first met Elton John in 1965, and in 1967 helped him to get studio time to record demos at Dick James' studio, where he worked as an engineer. They played together in the Bread and Beer Band, and Quaye produced John's first solo single. Quaye played off and on for more than 10 years with John, both as a session player and later full band member, appearing on all of his earliest recordings and albums as a session player until the beginning of 1972, as well as being a member of Bluesology during 1967/68. He finally fully joined the Elton John Band in May 1975 for the Rock of the Westies and Blue Moves albums, as well as subsequent 1975/76 Elton tours.

In 2019, an old and previously unreleased song he co-wrote with Elton John in the late 1960s, "Thank You For All Your Loving", was featured in the film Rocketman.

Hall & Oates
In 1978, Quaye along with fellow Elton John Band members Kenny Passarelli and Roger Pope joined Hall & Oates. This group recorded Livetime as well as the September 1978 release Along the Red Ledge.  Caleb also played on Daryl Hall's first solo album which also featured Passarelli, Pope, and Robert Fripp (King Crimson).

Christian faith and music ministry
In 1982, Quaye embraced the Christian faith becoming a musician/evangelist. From 1986 to 1995, Quaye was an Associate Pastor, Chief Musician and Staff Evangelist at the Foursquare Church in Pasadena, California. Since 1996, Quaye has served as the National Worship Director for the Foursquare denomination, ministering throughout the United States, England and Europe.

Quaye used to serve as adjunct faculty at LIFE Pacific College in San Dimas, California, teaching music and worship leadership. He is also one of the elders in the church that meets in the chapel on campus.

In February 2006, Vision Publishing released Quaye's autobiography, A Voice Louder Than Rock & Roll, in paperback. The book is credited to "Caleb Quaye with Dale A. Berryhill."

From 2008 on, Quaye released two jazz-rock fusion CDs. The first one was One Night in San Dimas, with Out of the Blue as the 2010 follow-up album; both of which he plays his signature model Brazen guitar, loaded with Seymour Duncan pick-ups.

He now serves at The Church On The Way, Van Nuys CA.

Collaborations 
With Elton John
 Empty Sky (DJM Records, 1969)
 Elton John (DJM Records, 1970)
 Tumbleweed Connection (DJM Records, 1970)
 Madman Across the Water (Uni Records, 1971) - With Rick Wakeman
 Rock of the Westies (MCA Records, 1975)
 Blue Moves (Rocket, 1976)
 Regimental Sgt. Zippo (Mercury, 2021

With Jennifer Holliday
 Feel My Soul (Geffen, 1983)

With Bernie Taupin
 Taupin (DJM Records, 1971)

With Bruce Johnston
 Going Public (Columbia Records, 1977)

With Brenda Russell
 Two Eyes (Warner Bros. Records, 1983)

With Hall & Oates
 Along the Red Ledge (RCA Records, 1978)

With Keb' Mo'
 Rainmaker (Chocolate City, 1980)

With Lou Reed
 Lou Reed (RCA Records, 1972) - With Steve Howe and Rick Wakeman.

With Dusty Springfield
 White Heat (Casablanca Records, 1982)

With Daryl Hall
 Sacred Songs (RCA Records, 1980) - With Robert Fripp, Tony Levin, Brian Eno, Phil Collins, Jerry Marotta, etc.

With Liza Minnelli
 Tropical Nights (Columbia Records, 1977)

With Peter Criss
 Let Me Rock You (Casablanca Records, 1982)

With Al Kooper
 New York City (You're a Woman) (Columbia Records, 1971)

With Joan Baez
 Recently (Gold Castle, 1987)

With Yvonne Elliman
 Food of Love (Purple Records, 1973)

With Harry Nilsson
 Nilsson Schmilsson (RCA Victor, 1971)

References

External links
 Caleb's Band Page on New World Music Ministries, Inc. (archived)
 2007 video of Quaye discussing the connection between his spiritual faith and musical creativity
 March 2010 Hollywood music in Media nomination
 Caleb Quaye on Allmusic.com

Living people
1948 births
Musicians from London
English session musicians
English expatriates in the United States
English people of Ghanaian descent
English Christians
English record producers
British rhythm and blues boom musicians
Black British rock musicians
Elton John Band members
English rock guitarists
Hall & Oates members
Bluesology members